Aditya Lakhia is an Indian character actor. He did his schooling from Mayo College, Ajmer. He began his acting career in 1988 playing small roles and worked as an assistant director in Akele Hum Akele Tum. The character of Kachra in the movie Lagaan remains one of his most memorable performances. He is working in various supporting roles.

He has worked in Chotti Bahu Season 2 and Agle Janam Mohe Bitiya Hi Kijo on television.

His late brother Ashish Lakhia also was part of the film industry and worked as an Art Director.

Filmography

Om-Dar-B-Dar (1988)
Rihaee (1988)
Jo Jeeta Wohi Sikandar (1992)
Kabhi Haan Kabhi Naa (1993)
Akele Hum Akele Tum (1995) (assistant director)
X Zone as Viren(Episode 87-88) (1998)
Ssshhhh...Koi Hai (2001)
Lagaan: Once Upon a Time in India (2001)
Humraaz (2002)
3 Deewarein (2003) as Malli
Mumbai Se Aaya Mera Dost (2003)
Kuchh Meetha Ho Jaye (2005)
Ramji Londonwale (2005)
Ek Ajnabee (2005)
Tom, Dick, and Harry (2006)
Gafla (2006)
Shootout at Lokhandwala (2007)
Shaurya as Capt R. P Singh(2008)
Mission Istaanbul (2008)
Agle Janam Mohe Bitiya Hi Kijo (2009–2011) as Nanku; Laali's father
Kaalo (2010) as Raghu
Riwayat (2010)
Stanley Ka Dabba (2011)
The Sholay Girl (2019)
Koi Jaane Na (2021)

References

External links
 

Indian male film actors
Living people
Male actors in Hindi cinema
Mayo College alumni
Year of birth missing (living people)